Indra Parish is an administrative unit of Krāslava Municipality, Latvia.

References

Parishes of Latvia
Krāslava Municipality